Argyrops spinifer is also known as king soldierbream, Bowen snapper, frying-pan snapper, frypan bream, long-spined red bream, longfin snapper, longspine seabream and red bokako. It is a species of fish in the family Sparidae.

It is used as seafood and can be found in the Red Sea, Eastern coast of Africa and northern Australia.

References

Sparidae
Taxa named by Peter Forsskål
Fish described in 1775